Schwarz may refer to:

 Schwarz, Germany, a municipality in Mecklenburg-Vorpommern, Germany
 Schwarz (surname), a surname (and list of people with the surname)
 Schwarz (musician), American DJ and producer
 Schwarz (Böhse Onkelz album), released simultaneously with Weiß, 1993
 Schwarz (Conrad Schnitzler album), a reissue of the 1971 Kluster album Eruption
 Schwarz (cards), in some card games, a Schneider (low point score) in which no tricks are taken
 Schwarz Gruppe, a multinational retail group
 Schwarz Pharma, a German drug company

See also
 
 
 Schwartz (disambiguation)
 Schwarzhorn (disambiguation)
 Swartz (disambiguation)